Santiago Morandi Vidal (born 6 April 1984) is a Uruguayan association football Goalkeeper- 

His last club was the Uruguayan team Villa Teresa.

References
 Profile at BDFA 
 

1984 births
Living people
Uruguayan footballers
Uruguayan expatriate footballers
Footballers from Montevideo
Central Español players
C.A. Rentistas players
C.A. Progreso players
Ñublense footballers
San Marcos de Arica footballers
C.S.D. Municipal players
C.D. Suchitepéquez players
Heredia Jaguares de Peten players
Primera B de Chile players
Expatriate footballers in Chile
Expatriate footballers in Brazil
Expatriate footballers in Mexico
Expatriate footballers in Guatemala
Association football goalkeepers
Deportes Melipilla footballers